is the sixth single by Japanese girl group Melon Kinenbi. It was released on June 19, 2002, and its highest position on the Oricon weekly chart was #14.

An English-language cover ("Dangerous Summer Night!") was recorded by Maysa Leak for the album Cover Morning Musume Hello! Project!.

Track listing
 
 
 "Natsu no Yoru wa Danger!" (Instrumental)

References

External links
 Natsu no Yoru wa Danger! at the Up-Front Works release list (Zetima)(Japanese)

2002 singles
Zetima Records singles
Japanese synth-pop songs
2002 songs